Warren Airport  is located in Red Hill,  South of Warren, in New South Wales, Australia.

See also
 List of airports in New South Wales

References

Airports in New South Wales